Swing Softly is the fifth album by American pop singer Johnny Mathis that was released on July 28, 1958, by Columbia Records and was a departure from the ballads that accounted for the vast majority of singles and album tracks he had recorded thus far. This project features uptempo arrangements of popular standards, most of which originated in a movie or stage musicals, and a couple of new songs: "To Be in Love" and "Easy to Say (But Hard to Do)".

The album made its first appearance on Billboard magazine's list of the 25 Best-Selling Pop LPs in the US in the issue dated September 8, 1958, and peaked at number six over the course of 16 weeks. It also spent its one week on the UK album chart at number 10 and received Gold certification from the Recording Industry Association of America for sales of 500,000 copies in the US on December 4, 1962.

The album was released for the first time on compact disc in 2000 as one of two albums on one CD, the other LP being another of his Gold records, Warm from 1957.

Reception
Allmusic's Greg Adams noted, "Close listeners will appreciate the purity of Mathis's vocal technique, which differs markedly from that of later singers for its infrequent use of modulation." He concludes, "Mathis swings with ease on these twelve favorites and offers something a little bit different from his previous albums."

Track listing

Side one
"You Hit the Spot" from Collegiate (Mack Gordon, Harry Revel) – 2:52
"It's De-Lovely" from Red Hot and Blue (Cole Porter) – 2:47
"Get Me to the Church on Time" from My Fair Lady (Alan Jay Lerner, Frederick Loewe) – 1:45
"Like Someone in Love" from Belle of the Yukon (Johnny Burke, Jimmy Van Heusen) – 2:40
"You'd Be So Nice to Come Home To" from Something to Shout About (Porter) – 2:12
"Love Walked In" from The Goldwyn Follies (George Gershwin, Ira Gershwin) – 2:38

Side two
"This Heart of Mine" from Ziegfeld Follies (Arthur Freed, Harry Warren) – 2:31
"To Be in Love" (Bart Howard) – 3:01
"Sweet Lorraine" (Clifford Burrell, Mitchell Parish) – 2:24
"Can't Get Out of This Mood" from Seven Days' Leave (Frank Loesser, Jimmy McHugh) – 3:08
"I've Got the World on a String" (Harold Arlen, Ted Koehler) – 3:11
"Easy to Say (But So Hard to Do)" (Marvin Fisher, Jack Segal) – 2:44

Recording dates
From the liner notes for The Voice of Romance: The Columbia Original Album Collection:
May 15, 1958 — "Can't Get Out of This Mood", "Like Someone in Love", "To Be in Love", "You'd Be So Nice to Come Home To"
May 16, 1958 — "Easy to Say (But Hard to Do)", "I've Got the World on a String", "It's De-Lovely", "Love Walked In"
June 17, 1958 — "Get Me to the Church on Time", "Sweet Lorraine", "This Heart of Mine", "You Hit the Spot"

Personnel
Johnny Mathis – vocals
Mitch Miller – producer
Al Ham – producer
Percy Faith – arranger and conductor
Friedman Abeles – photography

References

Bibliography

1958 albums
Jazz albums by American artists
Johnny Mathis albums
Columbia Records albums
Albums arranged by Percy Faith
Albums conducted by Percy Faith
Albums produced by Mitch Miller
Albums recorded at CBS 30th Street Studio